956 Elisa (prov. designation:  or ) is a Flora asteroid from the inner regions of the asteroid belt, approximately  in diameter. It was discovered on 8 August 1921, by German astronomer Karl Reinmuth at the Heidelberg Observatory. The V-type asteroid has a rotation period of 16.5 hours. It was named after Elisa Reinmuth, mother of the discoverer.

Orbit and classification 

When applying the synthetic hierarchical clustering method (HCM) by Nesvorný, Elisa is a member of the Flora family, a giant asteroid family and the largest family of stony asteroids in the main-belt. However, according to another HCM-analysis by Milani and Knežević (AstDys), it is a background asteroid as this analysis does not recognize the Flora asteroid clan.

Elisa orbits the Sun in the inner asteroid belt at a distance of 1.8–2.8 AU once every 3 years and 6 months (1,273 days; semi-major axis of 2.3 AU). Its orbit has an eccentricity of 0.20 and an inclination of 6° with respect to the ecliptic. The body's observation arc begins at Heidelberg Observatory on 9 August 1921, the night after its official discovery observation.

Naming 

This minor planet was named after Elisa Reinmuth, mother of the discoverer Karl Reinmuth. The  was mentioned in The Names of the Minor Planets by Paul Herget in 1955.

Physical characteristics 

In both the Tholen- and SMASS-like taxonomy of the Small Solar System Objects Spectroscopic Survey (S3OS2), Elisa is a V-type asteroid. These asteroids are also called "Vestoids", thought to have originates from an ejecting impact event on 4 Vesta.

Rotation period 

In July 2008, a rotational lightcurve of Elisa was obtained from photometric observations by Matthieu Conjat at Nice Observatory in France. Lightcurve analysis gave a well-defined rotation period of  hours with a brightness variation of  magnitude.

Diameter and albedo 

The Collaborative Asteroid Lightcurve Link assumes a standard albedo for a Flora asteroid of 0.24 and calculates a diameter of 10.31 kilometers based on an absolute magnitude of 12.1.

References

External links 
 Lightcurve Database Query (LCDB), at www.minorplanet.info
 Dictionary of Minor Planet Names, Google books
 Asteroids and comets rotation curves, CdR – Geneva Observatory, Raoul Behrend
 Discovery Circumstances: Numbered Minor Planets (1)-(5000) – Minor Planet Center
 
 

000956
Discoveries by Karl Wilhelm Reinmuth
Named minor planets
19210808